Nayyar Kamal is a Pakistani television actress. She was the first actress who appeared in PTV first television play Aik Khaat on 28 November 1964.

Serials
She appeared in a number of plays and dramas in the late 1990s and earlier in the 1970s and also appeared in only one film in her whole career:
 Duhundlay Rastay
 Aik Khaat

Awards and recognition

Awards
 Nigar Award for Best Actress in 1970
 Hum Awards for Lifetime Achievement in Television in 2013
PTV Award for Best Actress 1973 for the play Naatak
PTV awards (Fifth PTV Awards) for Best Actress in 1984 for the play Chappar Chaaon 
PTV Silver jubilee award for acting for 50 years (1989)
PTV Best character portrayal 2006 for the play Aadhi Dhoop
Pride of Performance Award by the President of Pakistan in 2006
PTV lifetime achievement award in 2009
 President award in 2013

References

1944 births
Living people
Pakistani television actresses
20th-century Pakistani actresses
PTV Award winners
Hum Award winners
Recipients of the Pride of Performance